Hawthorn House is a Grade II listed building located on the main street in the town of Menai Bridge, on the Isle of Anglesey.

References

Grade II listed buildings in Anglesey
Houses in Anglesey
Menai Bridge